Reinier Cornelis Bakhuizen van den Brink Jr. (11 September 1911, Panjinangan, Sukabumi Regency, Java – 1 May 1987, Leiden) was a Dutch botanist. 

He was the son of Djahini of Tjiampea and Dutch botanist Reinier Cornelis Bakhuizen van den Brink (1881–1945) of the Dutch East Indies.

Taxonomy
 The abbreviation stands for "Bakhuizen filius".

References

External links 
 van den Brink  Authors  IPNI

1911 births
1987 deaths
Indo people
People from Sukabumi
20th-century Dutch botanists
20th-century Dutch East Indies people
Dutch people of the Dutch East Indies